One Angry Man is a 2010 film starring Jackie Mason and directed by Peter LeDonne and Steven Moskovic.

Premise
Jackie Mason stars as himself in a feature-length courtroom dramedy inspired by the Henry Fonda film 12 Angry Men.

Cast
Jackie Mason as Himself
Raoul Felder as Himself
Mike Gallagher as Prosecutor
Mark Levin as Judge F. Lee Levin
Jamie Colby as Alternate Juror
Tony Darrow as Bobby

References

External links

2010 films
2010 comedy films
2010s English-language films